The Planets, Op. 32, is a seven-movement orchestral suite by the English composer Gustav Holst, written between 1914 and 1917. In the last movement the orchestra is joined by a wordless female chorus. Each movement of the suite is named after a planet of the Solar System and its supposed astrological character.

The premiere of The Planets was at the Queen's Hall, London, on 29 September 1918, conducted by Holst's friend Adrian Boult before an invited audience of about 250 people. Three concerts at which movements from the suite were played were given in 1919 and early 1920. The first complete performance at a public concert was given at the Queen's Hall on 15 November 1920 by the London Symphony Orchestra conducted by Albert Coates.

The innovative nature of Holst's music caused some initial hostility among a minority of critics, but the suite quickly became and has remained popular, influential and widely performed. The composer conducted two recordings of the work, and it has been recorded at least 80 times subsequently by conductors, choirs and orchestras from the UK and internationally.

Background and composition

The Planets was composed over nearly three years, between 1914 and 1917. The work had its origins in March and April 1913, when Gustav Holst and his friend and benefactor Balfour Gardiner holidayed in Spain with the composer Arnold Bax and his brother, the author Clifford Bax. A discussion about astrology piqued Holst's interest in the subject. Clifford Bax later commented that Holst became "a remarkably skilled interpreter of horoscopes". Shortly after the holiday Holst wrote to a friend: "I only study things that suggest music to me. That's why I worried at Sanskrit. Then recently the character of each planet suggested lots to me, and I have been studying astrology fairly closely". He told Clifford Bax in 1926 that The Planets:

Imogen Holst, the composer's daughter, wrote that her father had difficulty with large-scale orchestral structures such as symphonies, and the idea of a suite with a separate character for each movement was an inspiration to him. Holst's biographer Michael Short and the musicologist Richard Greene both think it likely that another inspiration for the composer to write a suite for large orchestra was the example of Schoenberg's Five Pieces for Orchestra. That suite had been performed in London in 1912 and again in 1914; Holst was at one of the performances, and he is known to have owned a copy of the score.

Holst described The Planets as "a series of mood pictures", acting as "foils to one another", with "very little contrast in any one of them". Short writes that some of the characteristics the composer attributed to the planets may have been suggested by Alan Leo's booklet What is a Horoscope?, which he was reading at the time. Holst took the title of two movements – "Mercury, the Winged Messenger" and "Neptune, the Mystic" – from Leo's books. But although astrology was Holst's starting point, he arranged the planets to suit his own plan:

In an early sketch for the suite Holst listed Mercury as "no. 1", which Greene suggests raises the possibility that the composer's first idea was simply to depict the planets in the obvious order, from nearest the sun to the farthest. "However, opening with the more disturbing character of Mars allows a more dramatic and compelling working out of the musical material". 

Holst had a heavy workload as head of music at St Paul's Girls' School, Hammersmith, and director of music at Morley College, and had limited time for composing. Imogen Holst wrote, "Weekends and holidays were the only times when he could really get on with his own work, which is why it took him over two years to finish The Planets". She added that Holst's chronic neuritis in his right arm was troubling him considerably and he would have found it impossible to complete the 198 pages of the large full score without the help of two colleagues at St Paul's, Vally Lasker and Nora Day, whom he called his "scribes".

The first movement to be written was Mars in mid-1914, followed by Venus and Jupiter in the latter part of the year, Saturn and Uranus in mid-1915, Neptune later in 1915 and Mercury in early 1916. Holst completed the orchestration during 1917.

First performances

The premiere of The Planets, conducted at Holst's request by Adrian Boult, was held at short notice on 29 September 1918, during the last weeks of the First World War, in the Queen's Hall with the financial support of Gardiner. It was hastily rehearsed; the musicians of the Queen's Hall Orchestra first saw the complicated music only two hours before the performance, and the choir for Neptune was recruited from Holst's students at Morley College and St Paul's Girls' School. It was a comparatively intimate affair, attended by around 250 invited associates, but Holst regarded it as the public premiere, inscribing Boult's copy of the score, "This copy is the property of Adrian Boult who first caused the Planets to shine in public and thereby earned the gratitude of Gustav Holst."

At a Royal Philharmonic Society concert at the Queen's Hall on 27 February 1919 conducted by Boult, five of the seven movements were played in the order Mars, Mercury, Saturn, Uranus, and Jupiter. It was Boult's decision not to play all seven movements at this concert. Although Holst would have liked the suite to be played complete, Boult's view was that when the public were being presented with a completely new language of this kind, "half an hour of it was as much as they could take in". Imogen Holst recalled that  her father "hated incomplete performances of The Planets, though on several occasions he had to agree to conduct three or four movements at Queen's Hall concerts. He particularly disliked having to finish with Jupiter, to make a 'happy ending', for, as he himself said, 'in the real world the end is not happy at all'".

At a Queen's Hall concert on 22 November 1919, Holst conducted Venus, Mercury and Jupiter. There was another incomplete public performance, in Birmingham, on 10 October 1920, with five movements (Mars, Venus, Mercury, Saturn and Jupiter), conducted by the composer.
The first complete performance of the suite at a public concert was on 15 November 1920; the London Symphony Orchestra was conducted by Albert Coates. The first complete performance conducted by the composer was on 13 October 1923, with the Queen's Hall Orchestra.

Instrumentation 
The work is scored for a large orchestra. Holst's fellow composer Ralph Vaughan Williams wrote in 1920, "Holst uses a very large orchestra in the Planets not to make his score look impressive, but because he needs the extra tone colour and knows how to use it". The score calls for the following instrumentation. The movements vary in the combinations of instruments used.
Woodwinds: four flutes (third doubling first piccolo and fourth doubling second piccolo and "bass flute in G", actually an alto flute), three oboes (third doubling bass oboe), one cor anglais, three clarinets in B and A, one bass clarinet in B, three bassoons, one contrabassoon
Brass: six horns in F, four trumpets in C, two trombones, one bass trombone, one tenor tuba in B (often played on a euphonium), one tuba
Percussion: six timpani (two players); triangle, side drum, tambourine, cymbals, bass drum, gong, tubular bells, glockenspiel (three players), xylophone (two players)
Keyboards: organ, celesta
Strings: two harps, violins i, ii, violas, cellos, double basses

In Neptune, two three-part women's choruses (each comprising two soprano sections and one alto section) located in an adjoining room which is to be screened from the audience are added.
Source: Published score.

Structure

1. Mars, the Bringer of War

Mars is marked allegro and is in a relentless  ostinato for most of its duration. It opens quietly, the first two bars played by percussion, harp and col legno strings. The music builds to a quadruple-forte, dissonant climax. Although Mars is often thought to portray the horrors of mechanised warfare, it was completed before the First World War started. The composer Colin Matthews writes that for Holst, Mars would have been "an experiment in rhythm and clashing keys", and its violence in performance "may have surprised him as much as it galvanised its first audiences". Short comments, "harmonic dissonances abound, often resulting from clashes between moving chords and static pedal-points", which he compares to a similar effect at the end of Stravinsky’s The Firebird, and adds that although battle music had been written before, notably by Richard Strauss in Ein Heldenleben, "it had never expressed such violence and sheer terror".

2. Venus, the Bringer of Peace

According to Imogen Holst, Venus "has to try and bring the right answer to Mars". The movement opens with a solo horn theme answered quietly by the flutes and oboes. A second theme is given to solo violin. The music proceeds tranquilly with oscillating chords from flutes and harps, with decoration from the celesta. The oboe solo in the central largo is one of the last romantic melodies Holst allowed himself before turning to a more austere manner in later works. Leo called the planet "the most fortunate star under which to be born"; Short calls Holst's Venus "one of the most sublime evocations of peace in music".

3. Mercury, the Winged Messenger

The composer R. O. Morris thought it the nearest of the movements to "the domain of programme music pure and simple ... it is essentially pictorial in idea. Mercury is a mere activity whose character is not defined". This movement, the last of the seven to be written, contains Holst's first experiments with bitonality. He juxtaposes melodic fragments in B major and E major, in a fast-moving scherzo. Solo violin, high-pitched harp, flute and glockenspiel are prominently featured.

4. Jupiter, the Bringer of Jollity

In this movement Holst portrays Jupiter's supposedly characteristic "abundance of life and vitality" with music that is buoyant and exuberant. Nobility and generosity are allegedly characteristics of those born under Jupiter, and in the slower middle section Holst provides a broad tune embodying those traits. In the view of Imogen Holst, it has been compromised by its later use as the melody for a solemn patriotic hymn, "I Vow to Thee, My Country"; the music writer Lewis Foreman comments that the composer did not think of it in those terms, as shown by his own recordings of the movement. The opening section of the movement is marked allegro  giocoso, in  time. The second theme, at the same tempo, is in  time, as is the broad melody of the middle section, marked andante maestoso, which Holst marks to be taken at half the speed of the opening section. The opening section returns and after a reappearance of the maestoso tune – its expected final cadence unresolved, as in its first appearance – the movement ends with a triple forte quaver chord for the full orchestra.

5. Saturn, the Bringer of Old Age

Saturn was Holst's favourite movement of the suite. Matthews describes it as "a slow processional which rises to a frightening climax before fading away as if into the outer reaches of space". Apart from the timpani no percussion is used in this movement except for tubular bells at climactic points. At the beginning, flutes, bassoons and harps play a theme suggesting a ticking clock. A solemn melody is introduced by the trombones (Holst's own main instrument) and taken up by the full orchestra. A development of the ticking theme leads to a clangorous triple forte climax, after which the music dies away and ends quietly.

6. Uranus, the Magician

Matthews describes the character of the movement as that of "a clumsy dance, which gradually gets more and more out of hand (not unlike Dukas's Sorcerer's Apprentice) until, with what seems like a magic wand, all is abruptly swept away into the far distance".

7. Neptune, the Mystic

The music of the last movement is quiet throughout, in a swaying, irregular metre, opening with flutes joined by piccolo and oboes, with harps and celesta prominent later. Holst makes much use of dissonance in this movement. Before the premiere his colleague Geoffrey Toye said that a bar where the brass play chords of E minor and G minor together was "going to sound frightful". Holst agreed, and said it had made him shudder when he wrote it down but, "What are you to do when they come like that?" As the movement develops, the orchestra is joined by an offstage female chorus singing a soft wordless line: this was unusual in orchestral works at the time, although Debussy had used the same device in his  Nocturnes (1900). The orchestra falls silent and the unaccompanied voices bring the work to a pianissimo conclusion in an uncertain tonality, as a door between the singers and the auditorium is gradually closed.

Reception

Imogen Holst wrote of the 1918 premiere under Boult:

When the music was first introduced to the general public in February 1919, critical opinion was divided. Greene prints a summary of reviews of the first four public performances of the suite (or movements from it) in February and November 1919 and October and November 1920. Positive reviews are recorded in 28 of the 37 papers, magazines and journals cited. A small minority of reviewers were particularly hostile, among them those of The Globe ("Noisy and pretentious)"; The Sunday Times ("Pompous, noisy and unalluring"), and The Times ("a great disappointment … elaborately contrived and painful to hear"). The critic in The Saturday Review wrote that Holst evidently regarded the planets "as objectionable nuisances that he would oust from our orbit if he could".

The Times rapidly changed its mind; in July 1919 it called Holst the most intriguing of his compeers and commented, "The Planets still leaves us gasping"; after hearing Holst conduct three of the movements in November 1919 the paper's critic declared the piece "the first music by an Englishman we have heard for some time which is neither conventional nor negligible", and by the time of Holst's death in 1934 the paper's assessment of the piece was "Holst's greatest work":

The Sunday Times, too, quickly changed its line. In 1920 its new music critic, Ernest Newman, said that Holst could do "easily, without a fuss" what some other composers could only do "with an effort and a smirk", and that in The Planets he showed "one of the subtlest and most original minds of our time. It begins working at a musical problem where most other minds would leave off". Newman compared Holst's harmonic innovations to those of Stravinsky, to the latter's disadvantage, and expressed none of the reservations that qualified his admiration of Schoenberg's Five Pieces for Orchestra.

Recordings

There have been at least 80 commercial recordings of The Planets. Holst conducted the London Symphony Orchestra in the first two recorded performances: the first was an acoustic recording made in sessions between September 1922 and November 1923; the second was made in 1926 using the new electrical recording process. Holst's tempi are in general faster than those of most of his successors on record. This may have been due to the need to fit the music on 78 rpm discs, although later 78 versions are slower. Holst's later recording is quicker than the acoustic version, possibly because the electrical process required wider grooves, reducing the available playing time. Other, slower, recordings from the 78 era include those conducted by Leopold Stokowski (1943) and Sir Adrian Boult (1945).  Recordings from the LP age are also typically longer than the composer's, but from the digital era a 2010 recording by the London Philharmonic Orchestra conducted by Vladimir Jurowski is quicker than Holst's acoustic version and comes close to matching his 1926 speeds, and in two movements (Venus and Uranus) surpasses them. There were no commercial recordings of the work in the 1930s; timings are given below of a recording representing each subsequent decade up to the 2010s:

Source: Naxos Music Library.

Additions, adaptations and influences

There have been many adaptations of the suite, and several attempts to add an eighth planet – Pluto – in the time between its discovery in 1930 and its downgrading to "dwarf planet" in 2006. The most prominent of these was Matthews's 2000 composition, "Pluto, the Renewer", commissioned by the Hallé Orchestra. Dedicated posthumously to Imogen Holst, it was first performed in Manchester on 11 May 2000, with Kent Nagano conducting. Matthews changed the ending of Neptune slightly so that the movement would segue into Pluto. Matthews's Pluto has been recorded, coupled with Holst's suite, on at least four occasions. Others who have produced versions of Pluto for The Planets include Leonard Bernstein and Jun Nagao.

The suite has been adapted for numerous instruments and instrumental combinations, including organ, synthesiser, brass band, and jazz orchestra. Holst used the melody of the central section of "Jupiter" for a setting ("Thaxted") of the hymn "I Vow to Thee, My Country" in 1921.

The Planets has been taken as an influence by various rock bands, and for film scores such as those for the Star Wars series. There have been numerous references to the suite in popular culture, from films to television and computer games.

Notes, references and sources

Notes

References

Sources

External links 

 Links to public domain scores of The Planets:
 
 The Planets: Suite for Large Orchestra (Score in the Public Domain)

1916 compositions
Concert band pieces
Compositions that use extended techniques
History of astrology
Music for orchestra and organ
Suites by Gustav Holst